Campiglossa quadriguttata is a species of tephritid or fruit flies in the genus Campiglossa of the family Tephritidae.

Distribution
The species is found in Mongolia, East of Russia.

References

Tephritinae
Insects described in 1927
Diptera of Asia